Maxillaria densa, the crowded maxillaria, is a species of orchid ranging from Mexico south to Nicaragua.

Gymnopusin is a phenanthrenediol produced by the orchid as well as 2,5-dihydroxy-3,4-dimethoxyphenanthrene, 9,10-dihydro-2,5-dihydroxy-3,4-dimethoxyphenanthrene, 2,7-dihydroxy-3,4-dimethoxyphenanthrene (nudol), 9,10-dihydro-2,7-dihydroxy-3,4-dimethoxyphenanthrene, 2,5-dihydroxy-3,4,9-trimethoxyphenanthrene and 2,7-dihydroxy-3,4,9-trimethoxyphenanthrene.

References

External links 

densa
Orchids of Central America
Orchids of Belize
Orchids of Mexico
Plants described in 1836